The 2020–21 FIS Freestyle Ski World Cup was the 49th World Cup season in freestyle skiing organised by International Ski Federation. The season started on 20 November 2020 and finished on 27 March 2021. This season included six disciplines: moguls, aerials, ski cross, halfpipe, slopestyle and big air.

Men

Ski Cross

Moguls

Dual Moguls

Aerials

Halfpipe

Slopestyle

Big Air

Ladies

Ski Cross

Moguls

Dual Moguls

Aerials

Halfpipe

Slopestyle

Big Air

Team

Ski Cross Team

Team Aerials

Men's standings

Ski Cross

Ski Cross Alps Tour

Moguls

Aerials

Park & Pipe overall (HP/SS/BA)

Halfpipe

Slopestyle

Big Air

Ladies' standings

Ski Cross

Ski Cross Alps Tour

Moguls

Aerials

Park & Pipe overall (HP/SS/BA)

Halfpipe

Slopestyle

Big Air

Team

Team Aerials

Ski Cross Team

Nations Cup

Overall

Achievements

References 

FIS Freestyle Skiing World Cup
World Cup
World Cup